Birsa Munda College, is a new general degree college in Hatighisa, Darjeeling district. It offers undergraduate courses in arts, science, and commerce. It is affiliated with the University of North Bengal.

Departments
English 
Hindi
Nepali
History
Political Science
Education
Sociology
Commerce

See also

References

External links
http://birsamundacollege.ac.in/
University of North Bengal
University Grants Commission
National Assessment and Accreditation Council

Colleges affiliated to University of North Bengal
Universities and colleges in Darjeeling district
2018 establishments in West Bengal
Educational institutions established in 2018